Little Murder is a 2011 supernatural horror thriller film directed by Predrag Antonijević. The film premiered at the Palm Springs International Film Festival on January 8, 2011. The movie was distributed wide in the US on February 17, 2017 under the new title Ghost of New Orleans.

Plot 
The story centers on a humiliated detective Ben Chaney (Josh Lucas) who gets a sudden shot at salvation when the ghost of a murdered cellist Corey Little (Lake Bell) solicits his help in finding her killer as he was on a stakeout of a serial killer suspect, Drag Hammerman. As Chaney unravels the truth behind Little's night of murder, a little turn of events revealed the killer to all of the murders, including Little's, to be the very same man all along.

Cast 
 Josh Lucas as Ben Chaney
 Terrence Howard as Drag Hammerman
 Lake Bell as Corey Little
 Sharon Leal as Jennifer
 Cary Elwes as Barry Fitzgerald
 Bokeem Woodbine as Lipp
 Peter Jason as Lt. Wills
 Noah Bean as Paul Marais
 Nick Lashaway as Tom Little
 Deborah Ann Woll as Molly
 Brandon Molale as Bobby
 Ele Bardha as Manny
 Sonya A. Avakian as Paul's Housekeeper
 Sean H. Robertson as Crime Scene Officer #2

Production 
The film is shooting in Detroit and New Orleans, Little Murder is the third US production for the Serbian director Predrag "Peter Gaga" Antonijevic.

Rumors of the film's budget problems surfaced after numerous complaints to the Michigan state film office were made by local vendors for goods and services that were not paid for. The Townsend Hotel in Birmingham, Michigan filed suit, claiming the production company accumulated a tab of over $37,000 before leaving town without paying.

See also
 List of ghost films

References

External links 
 
 

2011 films
Films shot in Louisiana
Films shot in Michigan
Films shot in New Orleans
American independent films
American supernatural thriller films
2010s English-language films
Films directed by Predrag Antonijević
2010s American films